Carbon County is a county in the U.S. state of Wyoming. As of the 2020 United States Census, the population was 14,537. Its county seat is Rawlins. Its south border abuts the north line of Colorado.

History
Carbon County was organized in 1868, one of the five original counties in Dakota Territory.

Originally about  near the center of Wyoming, Carbon County was once part of the Spanish Empire, then part of the Republic of Texas (1835-1845) and part of the State of Texas until 1852 when the northernmost part of that state's claims were ceded to the US government. This area is defined by the 42nd parallel on the north, and straight lines south from there to the headwaters of the Arkansas river on the east and the headwaters of the Rio Grande on the west. The documents defining that area include the Adams-Onís Treaty of 1819, the 1824 Constitution of Mexico, and the 1845 "Joint Resolution for the Admission of the State of Texas into the Union".

Carbon County was organized December 16, 1868, from Laramie County in Dakota Territory, which at the time had jurisdiction over part of modern-day Wyoming. It became a county in Wyoming Territory when that territory's government was formally organized on May 19, 1869.

In 1868, the Union Pacific Railroad opened the first coal mine in Carbon County, and the county was named for its extensive coal deposits. In 1875, Carbon County lost territory when Johnson County was created by the legislature of the Wyoming Territory. Natrona County was created with land ceded by Carbon County in 1888. The boundaries of the county were final at that time except for minor adjustments in 1911.

From 1978 to 1982, Carbon County was represented in the Wyoming House of Representatives by Democrat Thomas E. Trowbridge (1930-2009) of Saratoga, a Nebraska native. From 1982 to 1986, Trowbridge was a member of the Wyoming State Senate. He was later appointed by Governor Mike Sullivan to the Wyoming State Board of Equalization. Trowbridge's father, Elton Trowbridge, held the state House seat from Carbon County from 1961 until his death in office in 1974.

George R. Salisbury Jr., a rancher from Savery, represented Carbon County in the Wyoming House from 1975 to 1986. He was succeeded in office by his son-in-law and fellow Democrat, Patrick F. O'Toole, also a Savery rancher.

Geography
It is the third-largest county in Wyoming by area.

Major highways
   Interstate 80
  U.S. Highway 30
  U.S. Highway 287

Adjacent counties

 Sweetwater County - west
 Fremont County - northwest
 Natrona County - north
 Converse County - northeast
 Albany County - east
 Jackson County, Colorado - southeast
 Routt County, Colorado - south
 Moffat County, Colorado - southwest

National protected areas and State historical sites
 Fort Fred Steele State Historic Site
 Medicine Bow National Forest (part)
 Pathfinder National Wildlife Refuge (part)

Demographics

2000 census
As of the 2000 United States Census, there were 15,639 people, 6,129 households, and 4,130 families in the county. The population density was 2 people per square mile (1/km2). There were 8,307 housing units at an average density of 1 per square mile (0/km2). The racial makeup of the county was 90.11% White, 0.67% African-American or Black, 1.27% Indigenous American, 0.67% Asian, 0.06% Pacific Islander, 5.17% from other races, and 2.05% from two or more races.  13.83% of the population were Hispanic or Latino of any race. 20.1% were of German, 11.8% English, 10.0% Irish and 8.9% American ancestry.

There were 6,129 households, out of which 31.20% had children under the age of 18 living with them, 55.10% were married couples living together, 8.30% had a female householder with no husband present, and 32.60% were non-families. Of 6,129 households, 364 were unmarried partner households: 318 heterosexual, 41 same-sex male, and 5 same-sex female.

27.50% of all households were made up of individuals, and 9.60% had someone living alone who was 65 years of age or older.  The average household size was 2.39 and the average family size was 2.91.

The county population contained 24.10% under the age of 18, 8.60% from 18 to 24, 28.40% from 25 to 44, 26.70% from 45 to 64, and 12.30% who were 65 years of age or older. The median age was 39 years. For every 100 females there were 115.30 males. For every 100 females age 18 and over, there were 118.10 males.

The median income for a household in the county was $36,060, and the median income for a family was $41,991. Males had a median income of $31,603 versus $21,451 for females. The per capita income for the county was $18,375. About 9.80% of families and 12.90% of the population were below the poverty line, including 16.60% of those under age 18 and 14.80% of those age 65 or over.

2010 census
As of the 2010 United States Census, there were 15,885 people, 6,388 households, and 4,109 families in the county. The racial makeup of the county was 88.8% white, 1.0% American Indian, 0.7% black or African American, 0.7% Asian, 0.1% Pacific islander, 6.5% from other races, and 2.2% from two or more races. Those of Hispanic or Latino origin made up 16.8% of the population. In terms of ancestry, 26.0% were German, 15.8% were English, 14.4% were Irish, 5.6% were Scottish, and 4.8% were American.

Of the 6,388 households, 30.8% had children under the age of 18 living with them, 51.5% were married couples living together, 7.8% had a female householder with no husband present, 35.7% were non-families, and 29.6% of all households were made up of individuals. The average household size was 2.36 and the average family size was 2.91. The median age was 38.9 years.

The median income for a household in the county was $56,565 and the median income for a family was $65,171. Males had a median income of $51,201 versus $32,603 for females. The per capita income for the county was $26,122. About 5.6% of families and 8.2% of the population were below the poverty line, including 9.6% of those under age 18 and 9.6% of those age 65 or over.

Government and infrastructure
During the twentieth century, owing to its considerable unionized mining population, Carbon County tended to be much more Democratic than the rest of generally Republican Wyoming. It was one of three Wyoming counties to vote for John F. Kennedy in 1960 and one of two to vote for Hubert Humphrey in 1968, while Dwight D. Eisenhower only won the county narrowly in his two landslide Presidential wins. In recent years, the county has trended much more towards the Republican Party due to changing demographics in the area.

The Wyoming State Penitentiary, operated by the Wyoming Department of Corrections, is located in Rawlins. The facility was operated by the Wyoming Board of Charities and Reform until that agency was dissolved as a result of a state constitutional amendment passed in November 1990.

Communities

City
 Rawlins (county seat)

Towns

 Baggs
 Dixon
 Elk Mountain
 Encampment
 Hanna
 Medicine Bow
 Riverside
 Saratoga
 Sinclair

Census-designated places
 Arlington
 Ryan Park

Unincorporated communities

 Leo
 McFadden
 Muddy Gap
 Savery
 Walcott
 Woodedge
• Fort Steele

See also

 National Register of Historic Places listings in Carbon County, Wyoming
Wyoming
List of cities and towns in Wyoming
List of counties in Wyoming
Wyoming statistical areas

References

Further reading

Bartos, T.T. et al. (2006). Water resources of Carbon County, Wyoming [Scientific Investigations Report 2006-5027]. Reston VA: US Department of the Interior, US Geological Survey.
Hettinger, R.D. and J.G. Honey. (2006). Geologic map and coal stratigraphy of the Doty Mountain quadrangle, eastern Washakie Basin, Carbon County, Wyoming [Scientific Investigations Map 2925]. Reston VA: US Department of the Interior, US Geological Survey.
Official seal

 
1868 establishments in Wyoming Territory